Pomos is a village in the Paphos District of Cyprus, located 17 km northeast of Polis Chrysochous.

Despite being one of the most remote villages of Cyprus it hosts several cultural events and festivities. 

The famous Idol of Pomos was discovered there.

References

Communities in Paphos District